Stephen, Steven, or Steve Gregory may refer to:

Stephen S. Gregory (1849–1920), Chicago lawyer
Stephen Gregory (author) (born 1952), Welsh horror writer
Steve Gregory (born 1945), English jazz saxophonist and composer
Steve Gregory (American football) (born 1983)
Steven Gregory (born 1987), English football midfielder
Stephen Gregory, executive with the newspaper  The Epoch Times